Maxim Oktyabrinovich Agapitov (Russian: Максим Октябринович Агапитов; born 13 May 1970) is a retired Russian weightlifter. He competed internationally between 1992 and 2000 and held the national title in 1993 and 1997 and the world title in 1997. After that he worked as a national coach (2003–2008) and weightlifting official. He took up weightlifting aged 10, following his father, who was a weightlifting coach.

Agapitov is an executive member of the International Weightlifting Federation, vice-president of the European Weightlifting Federation and president of the Russian Weightlifting Federation. 

In March 2022, Agapitov posted a clip from a Moscow rally at which Vladimir Putin lauded the 2022 Russian invasion of Ukraine.

References

1970 births
Living people
Russian male weightlifters
World Weightlifting Championships medalists
People from Tryokhgorny
Sportspeople from Chelyabinsk Oblast
20th-century Russian people
21st-century Russian people